The Daugavpils International Airport was located 12 km northeast of Daugavpils in the village of Lociki, Naujene Parish, Augšdaugava Municipality, in the Latgale region of Latvia.
 
All of the airport's technical infrastructure, runway and buildings are what was left of the former Soviet military air base. The base was completely abandoned in 1993.  Since 2005 the city council had sought to promote plans to redevelop it, but it was not able to obtain funding.

In 2021, Municipality voted to terminate activities of the Airport and start liquidation of the assets. One of the transition plans involves creating an industrial park on the territory.

History
In the past, the airport was home to 372 APIB (372nd Fighter-Bomber Aviation Regiment) flying MiG-23 and MiG-27 aircraft.

In 2005 Daugavpils City Council founded "Daugavpils lidosta" SIA (Daugavpils Airport Ltd.) to seek to develop the former military air base into Daugavpils International Airport.  They planned to build by 2015 an international and regional airport in Daugavpils suitable for large-scale airplanes which will allow for both international and domestic passenger traffic, international and domestic cargo transport and charter flights.  They had the intention to build a runway of 2500m in length and 46m in width.  They also hoped the building of an international regional airport would lead to the further development of other activities in the area based on servicing the airport and its customers.

References

External links 

 Operator's statement
 More details about development (Translated with Google Translate)

Defunct airports in Latvia
Transport in Daugavpils
Proposed airports
Augšdaugava Municipality
Proposed transport infrastructure in Latvia
Latgale
Unfinished buildings and structures
Soviet Air Force bases